Martakert may also refer to:
 Mardakert District (NKAO), a district of the former Nagorno-Karabakh Autonomous Oblast of the Soviet era Azerbaijan SSR. 
 Martakert Province, a province in the self-proclaimed Republic of Artsakh, of which Martakert city is the provincial capital.
 Martakert, the de facto provincial capital of Martakert Province in the Republic of Artsakh. It is also known as Aghdara, by which name it is a part of Tartar District, de jure in Azerbaijan.